"Mint Car" is a song by English rock band the Cure, released as the second single from their tenth studio album Wild Mood Swings in June 1996. It reached the top 20 in Finland and Iceland and peaked at number 31 on the UK Singles Chart.

Background
Robert Smith has stated in an interview that he thought this song was better than the British top-10 hit "Friday I'm in Love". Smith said, "it was the single, and I thought it was a better song than 'Friday'. But it did absolutely nothing because we weren't the band at that time. The zeitgeist wasn't right. It taught me that sometimes there's a tipping point, and if you're the band, you're the band, even if you don't want to be, and there's nothing you can do about it."

Release
Released on 17 June 1996, the song reached number 31 on the UK Singles Chart and number 14 on the Billboard Modern Rock Tracks chart. The single includes two remixes of the song, as well as three songs not available on the album. The "Busker's Mix" includes the acoustic guitar parts but omits electric guitar tracks. The "Electric Mix" contains the electric guitar parts, but leaves out the acoustic guitar. All of the B-sides, except the remixes, would go on to appear in the 2004 box set Join the Dots.

Track listings
All tracks were written by Robert Smith, Simon Gallup, Perry Bamonte, Jason Cooper, and Roger O'Donnell.

UK CD1
 "Mint Car"
 "Home"
 "Mint Car" (Buskers mix)

UK CD2
 "Mint Car" (Electric mix)
 "Waiting"
 "A Pink Dream"

European CD1 and Australian CD single
 "Mint Car" (radio mix)
 "Home"
 "Waiting"
 "A Pink Dream"

European CD2 and US CD1
 "Mint Car" (radio mix)
 "Home"

US CD2 and Canadian CD single
 "Mint Car" (Electric mix)
 "Waiting"
 "A Pink Dream"
 "Mint Car" (Buskers Mix)

Personnel
 Robert Smith – writing, vocals, guitar, production, mixing
 Simon Gallup – writing, bass
 Perry Bamonte – writing, guitar
 Jason Cooper – writing
 Roger O'Donnell – writing, keyboards
 Mark Price – drums
 Bob Thompson – drums on "Waiting"
 Steve Lyon – production, mixing on all tracks except "A Pink Dream"
 Steve Whitfield – mixing on "A Pink Dream"

Charts

Weekly charts

Year-end charts

Release history

References

External links
 

1995 songs
1996 singles
The Cure songs
Elektra Records singles
Fiction Records singles
Songs written by Jason Cooper
Songs written by Perry Bamonte
Songs written by Robert Smith (musician)
Songs written by Roger O'Donnell
Songs written by Simon Gallup
Jangle pop songs